Mehdi Moradi-Ganjeh (born 27 July 1964) is an Iranian wrestler. He competed in the men's Greco-Roman 82 kg at the 1988 Summer Olympics.

References

1964 births
Living people
Iranian male sport wrestlers
Olympic wrestlers of Iran
Wrestlers at the 1988 Summer Olympics
Place of birth missing (living people)